The San Jose Stealth are a lacrosse team based in San Jose, California playing in the National Lacrosse League (NLL). The 2007 season was the 8th in franchise history and 4th as the Stealth (previously the Albany Attack).

After a 1-5 start, the Stealth won eight of their final ten games, and finished the season in 4th place with a 9-7 record. In the division semi-final, they defeated the division-winning Colorado Mammoth in overtime before losing to the Arizona Sting in the division finals.

Regular season

Conference standings

Game log
Reference:Reference:

Playoffs

Game log
Reference:

Player stats
Reference:

Runners (Top 10)

Note: GP = Games played; G = Goals; A = Assists; Pts = Points; LB = Loose balls; PIM = Penalty minutes

Goaltenders
Note: GP = Games played; MIN = Minutes; W = Wins; L = Losses; GA = Goals against; Sv% = Save percentage; GAA = Goals against average

Transactions

Trades

Roster
Reference:

See also
2007 NLL season

References

San Jose
2007 in sports in California